Grayson County News Gazette is a weekly newspaper published on Saturdays.  It is based in Leitchfield, Kentucky.

The paper was previously owned by Heartland Publications. In 2012 Versa Capital Management merged Heartland, Ohio Community Media, former Freedom papers it had acquired, and Impressions Media into a new company, Civitas Media. Civitas Media sold the News Gazette to Paxton Media Group in 2017.

References

Newspapers published in Kentucky
Grayson County, Kentucky
Publications established in 1890
Leitchfield, Kentucky